The 47th government of Turkey (9 November 1989 – 23 June 1991) governed Turkey and was led by Yıldırım Akbulut of Motherland Party (ANAP).

Background 
On 31 October 1989, Turgut Özal, the previous prime minister, was elected as the president of Turkey. According to the constitution, he left the office of prime minister. After a short period during which Ali Bozer was the acting president, Turgut Özal appointed Yıldırım Akbulut to be the new prime minister.

The government
In the list below, the serving period of cabinet members who served only a part of the cabinet's lifespan are shown in the column "Notes".

Aftermath
During the congress of the Motherland Party on 15 June 1991, Mesut Yılmaz was elected as the new chairman of the party, and consequently, Yıldırım Akbulut resigned as prime minister.

References

Cabinets of Turkey
Motherland Party (Turkey) politicians
1989 establishments in Turkey
1991 disestablishments in Turkey
Cabinets established in 1989
Cabinets disestablished in 1991
Members of the 47th government of Turkey
18th parliament of Turkey
Motherland Party (Turkey)